Paul Guyer is an American philosopher and a leading scholar of Immanuel Kant and of aesthetics.  Since 2012, he has been Jonathan Nelson Professor of Philosophy and Humanities at Brown University.

Education and career

Guyer grew up on Long Island, New York, and attended public schools there, graduating from Lynbrook High School in 1965. He graduated summa cum laude from Harvard College in 1969, where he studied in the Departments of Philosophy and German; his Ph.D. in Philosophy was also taken at Harvard University, with a dissertation directed by Stanley Cavell.  Guyer joined the University of Pennsylvania in 1983 as a tenured faculty member, where he subsequently rose to the rank of Professor of Philosophy and F.R.C. Murray Professor in the Humanities. Prior to moving to the University of Pennsylvania, Guyer taught at the University of Pittsburgh from 1973 to 1978, and the University of Illinois, Chicago from 1978 to 1983. He has also been a visiting professor at Harvard, Princeton, and the University of Michigan.

Guyer was elected a Fellow of the American Academy of Arts and Sciences in 1999.  He has held fellowships from the National Endowment for the Humanities, the John Simon Guggenheim Memorial Foundation, and the Princeton University Center for Human Values.  He has also been a Research Prize Winner of the Alexander von Humboldt Foundation of the Federal Republic of Germany and a Daimler Fellow at the American Academy in Berlin.

Philosophical work

Guyer has written a dozen books on Kant and Kantian themes, and has edited and translated a number of Kant's works into English.  In addition to his work on Kant, Guyer has published on many other figures in the history of philosophy, including Locke, Hume, Hegel, Schopenhauer, and others. Guyer's Kant and The Claims of Knowledge (Cambridge University Press) is widely considered to be one of the most significant works in Kant scholarship. Recent works by Guyer include Knowledge, Reason, and Taste: Kant's Response to Hume (Princeton University Press), and The Cambridge Companion to Kant's Critique of Pure Reason (Cambridge University Press).  More recently, he has published Virtues of Freedom: Essays on Kant's Moral Philosophy (2016), Kant on the Rationality of Morality (2019), and Reason and Experience in Mendelssohn and Kant (2020).

His other areas of specialty include the history of philosophy and aesthetics.  His three-volume work A History of Modern Aesthetics was published by Cambridge University Press in February 2014.  In 2021, Cambridge published  A Philosopher Looks at Architecture. Guyer was President of the American Society for Aesthetics in 2011–13. Guyer was also President of the Eastern Division of the American Philosophical Association in 2011–12.

Selected books
Kant and the Claims of Taste (Cambridge, Mass:  Harvard University Press, 1979)
Kant and the Claims of Knowledge (Cambridge:  Cambridge University Press, 1987)
Kant on Freedom, Law and Happiness (Cambridge:  Cambridge University Press, 2000)
Knowledge, Reason and Taste:  Kant's Response to Hume (Princeton:  Princeton University Press, 2008)
A History of Modern Aesthetics, 3 volumes (Cambridge:  Cambridge University Press, 2014)
Virtues of Freedom (Oxford: Oxford University Press, 2016)
Kant on the Rationality of Morality (Cambridge: Cambridge University Press, 2019)
Reason and Experience in Mendelssohn and Kant (Oxford: Oxford University Press, 2020)
A Philosopher Looks at Architecture (Cambridge: Cambridge University Press, 2021)

See also

American philosophy
List of American philosophers

References

Living people
Kant scholars
University of Pennsylvania faculty
Harvard College alumni
Place of birth missing (living people)
American philosophers
University of Michigan faculty
Brown University faculty
Philosophers of art
Presidents of the American Philosophical Association
People from Nassau County, New York
Lynbrook Senior High School alumni
Translators of Immanuel Kant
Year of birth missing (living people)